Anna Sergeyeva (born 7 May 1975) is a Russian rower. She competed in the women's quadruple sculls event at the 2004 Summer Olympics.

References

1975 births
Living people
Russian female rowers
Olympic rowers of Russia
Rowers at the 2004 Summer Olympics
Rowers from Saint Petersburg